Goose Prairie is an unincorporated community in Yakima County, Washington, United States. It was founded by Tom Fife in 1886 who named it after a goose that visited the meadow one evening and stayed the night.

Fife donated a portion of his homestead to the Boy Scouts; the Grand Columbia council operates Camp Fife, a summer camp named in Fife's honor.

Besides the camp the meadow contains a number of cabins and a diner only open on summer holiday weekends.

Goose Prairie was the summer home of the 20th century United States Supreme Court Justice William O. Douglas. Eric Sevareid interviewed Douglas in Goose Prairie for the CBS Reports documentary Mr. Justice Douglas broadcast Sept. 6, 1972. The Yakima Valley Museum has a 16mm film of the program in its collection which can be viewed online.

It is also where Kay Kershaw and Isabelle Lynn operated the Double K Mountain Ranch; they played a key role in the designation of the nearby William O. Douglas Wilderness area.

Climate
This climatic region is typified by large seasonal temperature differences, with warm to hot (and often humid) summers and cold (sometimes severely cold) winters.  According to the Köppen Climate Classification system, Goose Prairie has a humid continental climate, abbreviated "Dfb" on climate maps.

References

Further reading
Kathleen Tresham Anderson. Birds, Bats & Bailing Wire. Lulu.com, 2009. 
William O. Douglas. Of Men and Mountains. New York: Harper & Brothers, 1950.
Bruce Allen Murphy. Wild Bill: The Legend and Life of William O. Douglas. New York: Random House, 2003. 
Jack Nelson. We Never Got Away. Yakima, WA: Franklin Press, 1965.

External links
GOOSEPRAIRIE (blog)
Camp Fife official website
Yakima Memory (photos from the collection of the Yakima Valley Museum)
Isabelle Lynn and Kay Kershaw At The Double Kay Mountain Ranch in Goose Prairie Washington/Chinook Pass

Unincorporated communities in Yakima County, Washington
Unincorporated communities in Washington (state)